Akinobu Kuroda  is professor of East Asian history in the Institute for Advanced Studies on Asia, University of Tokyo. He specialises in the complementarity of monies in East Asia, India, Africa, and Europe.

Career 
Kuroda studied at Kyoto University (BA, 1980, MA 1982, PhD Oriental history 1985. PhD economics 1995). Kuroda was a visiting scholar at Harvard-Yanching Institute, 2014–2015. He was the editor of the International Journal of Asian Studies for fourteen years until 2018. He has been the recipient of several research grants, including:

 International Collaborative Research on the Variety of Exchange and Multiplicity of Money in Global History , Japan Society for the Promotion of Science 
 International Cooperative Research on the Multiplicity of Money: Division of Labour among Monies and its Comparison in the World History , Japan Society for the Promotion of Science 
 Money as Social Circuit: Interdisciplinary Research on the Complementarity between Anonymous Currency and Named Credit , Toyota Foundation 
 International Cooperative Research on the Complementarity among Monies Caused by Temporality, Seasonality, and Locality in Making Transactions , Japan Society for the Promotion of Science 
 Asymmetric Monies: Revisiting Global Monetary History from the Viewpoints of Complementarity and Viscosity , University of Tokyo Symposium Grant in Aid, 　
 Study on the Non-Uniformity and the Complementarity of Monetary Circulation in the World History: Searching for the Possibility of Autonomous and Concurrent Monetary System , Toyota Foundation 
 Unique Characteristics and Synchronicity of Currencies in Medieval and Early Modern East Asia and their Implications in the Theory of Money , Japanese Ministry of Education, Science and Technology 
 Comparative Historical Study of Foreign Currencies Circulation in Modern Asian and Africa , The Japan Society for the Promotion of Science 　
 Comparative Historical Study of Trade Silver Dollars Circulation in Asia and Africa and Their Demises , Japan Society for the Promotion of Science 
 Comparison between India and China in the Modern World System Centred around Money and Finance , Japanese Ministry of Education

Awards 

Selected publications 
Books

 2020  A Global History of Money, Routledge, Abingdon and New York.
 2020  , Iwanami , Tokyo, 2003;  supplemented version 2014;  Iwanami Contemporary Libraries version 2020. (Translated into Chinese :  translated by HE Ping , China's People UP, Beijing, 2007; translated into Korean,  translated by CHUNG Hye-jung 鄭恵仲, Nonhyung, Seoul, 2005).
 1994   Nagoya U.P., Nagoya.

Articles and Book Chapters

 2020  , 2020–1, 17-26 [Changes in usage of silver in Chinese monetary history - cut, weighed, recorded] (in Chinese)
 2018  'Famine of Cash: Why Have Local Monies Remained Popular throughout Human History?' in Georgina Gomez ed. Monetary Plurality in Local, Regional and Global Economies, Routledge, London, 114-122.
 2018  ‘Strategic Peasant and Autonomous Local Market: Revisiting the Rural Economy in Modern China’ International Journal of Asian Studies 15–2, 195–227. doi:10.1017/S1479591418000049
 2017  ‘Silvers Cut, Weighed, and Booked: Silver Usage in Chinese Monetary History ’, The Silver Age: Origins and Trade of Chinese Export Silver , Hong Kong Maritime Museum, pp. 109–121.
 2017   87，pp. 150– 161, 2017(4).
 2017  ‘Why and How Did Silver Dominate across Eurasia Late-13th through Mid-14th Century? : Historical Backgrounds of the Silver Bars Unearthed from Orheiul Vechi’, Tyragetia XI {XXVI} (1). Archaeology, pp. 23–34.
 2014  '' in K.Iinuma, Hirao Y. and S. Murai eds Daikokai jidai no nihon to kinzoku koeki , Shibunkaku shuppan , Kyoto, 2014, pp. 18–20.
 2013  ‘Anonymous Currencies or Named Debts?: Comparison of Currencies, Local Credits and Units of Account between China, Japan and England in the Pre-industrial Era’, Socio Economic Review 11–1, pp. 57–80. doi:10.1093/ser/mws013
 2013  ‘What was Silver Tael System? : A Mistake of China as Silver ‘Standard’ Country’, Moneta 160, pp. 391–397.
 2009  ‘The Eurasian Silver Century, 1276-1359: Commensurability and Multiplicity’, Journal of Global History 4–2, pp. 245–269, 2009. [ (1276-1359), translated by Gao Congming ,  THINKING 38–6, pp. 79–85, 2012]
 2008  ‘What is the Complementarity among Monies? An Introductory Note’, Financial History Review 15–1, pp. 7–15, 2008.
 2008  ‘Concurrent but Non-integrable Currency Circuits: Complementary Relationship among monies in Modern China and other Regions’, Financial History Review 15-1 pp. 17–36.
 2007  ‘The Maria Theresa Dollar in the Early Twentieth-century Red Sea Region: A Complementary Interface between Multiple Markets’, Financial History Review 14-1 pp. 89–110.
 2008  ‘Locating Chinese Monetary History in Global and Theoretical Contexts: From Multiple and Complementary Viewpoints’, in Huang Kuanzhong ed.  (Keynote and Variations: China from 7th century to 20th century) 2, Chengchi U. Dept of History, Taipei, pp. 33–50.
 2005  ‘The Collapse of the Chinese Imperial Monetary System’ in K. Sugihara ed. Japan, China and the Growth of the Asian International Economy, 1850-1949, Oxford U.P., pp. 103–126.
 2005  ‘Copper-Coins Chosen and Silver Differentiated – Another Aspect of ‘Silver Century’ in East Asia’, Acta Asiatica 88, pp. 65–86.
 2003  ‘What can Prices Tell us about the 16th-18th Century China?　- A Review of “ (Prices and Economic Change in Qing China)” by Kishimoto Mio’,  13, pp. 101–117.
 2000  ‘Another Monetary Economy: The Case of Traditional China’, in A.J.H. Latham and H. Kawakatsu eds. Asia Pacific Dynamism 1550-2000, Routledge, London, pp. 187–19.

Articles and Book Chapters in Japanese

 2008  '', in H. Imanishi ed.
 2007  '', in K. Suzuki ed. , Iwanami , Tokyo, pp. 7–42.
 1999  '', in  15, Iwanami , Tokyo, pp. 263–285, 1999.
 1998  '',  64–2, pp. 115–138.
 1998  '',  711, pp. 2–15.
 1996  '',  54–4, pp. 103–136.
 1995  '',  539, pp. 76–91.
 1994  '', in Satoru Nakamura ed. , Aoki , Tokyo, pp. 129–160.
 1991  '',  624, pp. 1–17.
 1991  '',  57–2, pp. 93–125.
 1988  '',  1–6, pp. 1–33, 1988.
 1987  '',  45–4, pp. 58–89.
 1986  ', in Sakae Tsunoyma ed.,  Dobunkan , Tokyo,  pp. 385–414.
 1985  '',  547, pp. 141–150.
 1984  '',  412, pp. 40–51.
 1983  '',  66-6, pp. 1–35.
 1982  '',  41–3, pp. 86–122.

External links 

 Kuroda at the Institute for Advanced Studies on Asia
 Kuroda on Academia.edu
 Kuroda on Worldcat

20th-century Japanese historians
Living people
Year of birth missing (living people)
Academic staff of the University of Tokyo
Kyoto University alumni
21st-century Japanese historians